Jon Christensen may refer to:

 Jon Christensen (musician) (1943–2020), Norwegian jazz drummer
 Jon Christensen (journalist) (born 1960), American freelance journalist
 Jon Christensen (politician) (born 1963), American politician and corporate executive

See also
 John Christensen (disambiguation)